Mai Thị Hạnh (born 1956) is the former spouse of the President of Vietnam Trương Tấn Sang from 2011 to 2016. Since her husband's retirement from politics following the 12th National Congress, Hạnh has been known for her philanthropy.

References 

Vietnamese philanthropists
21st-century Vietnamese politicians
Living people
Spouses of Vietnamese leaders
1956 births